Jan van der Merwe (born 31 August 1995 in Pretoria, South Africa) is a South African rugby union player who most recently played for the . His regular position is hooker.

Career

Despite initially not being named in a 37-man training squad for the South Africa national under-20 rugby union team, he did feature for them in a friendly match against a Varsity Cup Dream Team in April 2015. He came on as a first-half replacement and scored a try just after half-time in a 31–24 victory. He was also included in the squad that embarked on a two-match tour of Argentina. He came on as a replacement in their 25–22 victory over Argentina and started their second tour match a few days later, in which he scored two first-half tries in a 39–28 victory.

Upon the team's return, he was named in the final squad for the 2015 World Rugby Under 20 Championship. He started their opening match in Pool B of the competition and got South Africa's first points in the competition by scoring a try in a 33–5 win against hosts Italy. He played off the bench in their remaining two group stage fixtures, a 40–8 win against Samoa and a 46–13 win over Australia to help South Africa finish top of Pool B to qualify for the semi-finals with the best record pool stage of all the teams in the competition. Van der Merwe came on as a replacement in their semi-final match against England, but could not prevent them losing 20–28 to be eliminated from the competition by England for the second year in succession. He started their third-place play-off match against France, helping South Africa to a 31–18 win to secure third place in the competition.

References

South African rugby union players
Living people
1995 births
Rugby union players from Pretoria
Rugby union hookers
Blue Bulls players
South Africa Under-20 international rugby union players